Rupert Nicholas Vansittart (born 10 February 1958) is an English character actor. He has appeared in a variety of roles in film, television, stage and radio, often playing comic characters. He is best known for his role as Lord Ashfordly in the ITV drama Heartbeat and for playing  Lord Yohn Royce in the HBO series Game of Thrones (2014–2019).

Life and career
Vansittart is of partial Dutch ancestry and trained at the Central School of Speech and Drama.

Vansittart is known to fans of the 1995 Pride and Prejudice serial as the actor who portrayed Mr Hurst, the brother-in-law of Charles and Caroline Bingley. He has also worked with Rowan Atkinson on a number of occasions, appearing as a guest star in two episodes of Mr. Bean in addition to The Thin Blue Line, and Johnny English Reborn.

In 1993, he appeared in Remains of the Day as Sir Geoffrey Wren, a character based on the 1930s British fascist Sir Oswald Mosley.

In 1994, he appeared in the film Braveheart as Lord Bottoms. He worked in Four Weddings and a Funeral as George the Boor at the Boatman in 1995. In 2003, he appeared in the West End adaptation of Arsenic and Old Lace.

In 2002, he appeared in the Midsomer Murders episode "Market for Murder". He also portrayed General Asquith in the Doctor Who episodes "Aliens of London" and "World War Three". In 2006, Vansittart portrayed Thomas J. Dodd in the BBC three-part drama documentary Nuremberg: Nazis on Trial. In 2007, he appeared in another episode of Midsomer Murders, "The Axeman Cometh". He also appeared in the 2008 BBC serial Spartacus as Consul Lentulus.

In 2009, he was asked to play Peter Morrison in Margaret. Two years later in the critically acclaimed The Iron Lady with Meryl Streep he played Cabinet minister John Biffen. He has also played political characters on stage: in 2014 he was one of the main actors in the cast of Great Britain at the National Theatre. He also appeared in This House at the National Theatre.

2009 also saw his third appearance in Midsomer Murders, in the episode "The Dogleg Murders". In 2010, he appeared in Doctors as Anthony Chippington, a friend of Charlie's. He played Harrison Ashton Lard, the "posh girl's father", in How Not to Live Your Life. He provided additional voice-over for World's Craziest Fools. He appeared in the final two seasons of Foyle's War as Sir Alec Myerson, the title character's boss at MI5. Vansittart also appeared in the BBC Three comedy Bad Education, playing Mr. Humpage. In 2014, Vansittart started playing Lord Yohn Royce in the HBO series Game of Thrones, making recurring appearances in season 4, 5, 6, 7 and 8.
In 2016, he appears in the BBC TV series Father Brown as Arthur Le Broc in episode 4.7 "The Missing Man". In January 2016, he played Peter Jennings in an episode of the BBC series Casualty.

Personal life
Vansittart has been married to Emma Kate, daughter of the actor Moray Watson, since 1987. They have two children. When Emma Watson was cast for Harry Potter and the Philosopher's Stone, Emma Kate Watson changed her name to Emma Vansittart, adopting her husband's surname as her new stage name, to avoid being confused with the young actress.

Theatre
 The Revengers' Comedies (1989)
 Taking Steps (1990)
 The Revengers' Comedies (1991)
 A Westwood Diary (1996)
 Arsenic and Old Lace (2003)
 This House (2013)
 Great Britain (2014)

Filmography

 Bulman (1985, TV Series) .... Jack
 Plenty (1985) .... Client's Asst.
 The Comic Strip Presents... (1986, TV Series) .... Jeremy
 Half Moon Street (1986) .... Alan Platts-Williams
 Eat the Rich (1987) .... Rupert
 Buster (1988) .... Fairclough
 Ticket to Ride (1989)
 Wish Me Luck (1988–1989, TV Series) .... Guard in Factory / German Soldier at Station
 The Saint: The Brazilian Connection (1989, TV Movie) .... Wyatt
 The Piglet Files (1990–1991, TV Series) .... Zemskov / KGB Officer
 Heartbeat (1992–2009, TV Series) .... Lord Ashfordly
 Love Hurts (1993, TV Series) .... Richard Hollis
 Chef! (1993, TV Series) .... Diner
 Frank Stubbs (1993, TV Series) .... Businessman
 The Remains of the Day (1993) .... Sir Geoffrey Wren
 Headhunters (1994, TV Series) .... Michael Best
 Four Weddings and a Funeral (1994) .... George the boor at The Boatman - Wedding One
 Braveheart (1994) .... Lord Bottoms
 Mr. Bean (1994–1995, TV Series) .... Guardsman / Hubert
 Pride and Prejudice (1995, TV Mini-Series) .... Mr Hurst
 The Thin Blue Line (1995, TV Series) .... Commander Crow
 Cutthroat Island (1995) .... Captain Perkins
 Wilderness (1996, TV Mini-Series) .... Jeremy
 Supply and Demand (1997, TV Movie) .... Police Personnel
 Noah's Ark (1997, TV Series) .... Mark Villiers
 A Dance to the Music of Time (1997, TV Mini-Series) .... Soper
 Diana & Me (1997) .... Chef
 Painted Lady (1997, TV Movie) .... Henry Fellows
 Perfect Blue (1997) .... Flashback Date #2
 Berkeley Square (1998, TV Mini-Series) .... Lord Percy Wilton
 Monk Dawson (1998) .... Fr Timothy
 Vanity Fair (1998, TV Mini-Series) .... Smith
 Frenchman's Creek (1998, TV Movie) .... Lord Godolphin
 Birds of a Feather (1998–2014, TV Series) .... Counsel / Wayne
 CI5: The New Professionals (1999, TV Series) .... Chairman
 Eviction (1999, Short) .... The Landlord
 Kevin & Perry Go Large (2000) .... Bank manager
 The Bill (2000, TV Series) .... Solicitor
 Harry Enfield's Brand Spanking New Show (2000, TV Series)
 Black Books (2000, TV Series) .... Rich Guy
 Take a Girl Like You (2000, TV Series) .... Headmaster
 Sword of Honour (2001, TV Movie) .... Commander-in-Chief
 Sam's Game (2001, TV Series) .... Robert
 My Family (2000–2001, TV Series) .... Mr. Davis / Mr. Quince
 Randall and Hopkirk (Deceased) (2001, TV Series) .... Brian Babbacombe
 The Way We Live Now (2001, TV Mini-Series) .... Sir Damask Monogram
 The Falklands Play (2002, TV Movie) .... Sir Robert Armstrong
 Celeb (2002, TV Series) .... Johnson
 Menace (2002, TV Mini-Series) .... Ray Hutchens
 Midsomer Murders (2002–2009, TV Series) .... Alistair Kingslake / Desmond Harcourt / Selwyn Proctor
 My Dad's the Prime Minister (2003–2004, TV Series) .... Chancellor / Ballon
 One Last Chance (2004) .... Alisdair Robb
 The Brief (2004, TV Mini-Series) .... Prettyman
 Roman Road (2004, TV Movie) .... Farmer
 Twisted Tales (2005, TV Series) .... Dr. Mantle
 Doctor Who (2005, TV Series) .... General Asquith
 Wallis & Edward (2005, TV Movie) .... Chief Whip
 Coup! (2006, TV Movie) .... Roddy Hamilton
 Nuremberg: Nazis on Trial (2006, TV Mini-Series documentary) .... Thomas Dodd
 Hustle (2007, TV Series) .... Jonathan Mortimer-Howe
 Sensitive Skin (2007, TV Series) .... Interview Guest
 The Bank Job (2008) .... Sir Leonard Plugge
 Heroes and Villains (2008, TV Series documentary) .... Lentulus
 Caught in a Trap (2008, TV Movie) .... Judge
 Margaret (2009, TV Movie) .... Peter Morrison
 How Not to Live Your Life (2010, TV Series) .... Harrison
 Any Human Heart (2010, TV Mini-Series) .... The Earl
 Doctors (2010–2014, TV Series) .... Benedict 'Bennie' Harley / Mr. Graham Fitch / Anthony Chippington
 Comedy Showcase (2011, TV Series) .... Headmaster
 Johnny English Reborn (2011) .... Derek
 Holy Flying Circus (2011, TV Movie) .... Bernard Barnard QC
 The Iron Lady (2011) .... Cabinet Minister
 The Royal Bodyguard (2012, TV Mini-Series) .... Roderick Finch
 Bad Education (2012, TV Series) .... Mr. Humpage
 Foyle's War (2013–2015, TV Series, 5 episodes) .... Sir Alec Meyerson / Sir Alec Myerson
 Austenland (2013) .... Mr. Wattlesbrook
 National Theatre Live: This House (2013) .... Esher / Ensemble
 The Midnight Beast (2014, TV Series) .... Headmaster
 Death in Paradise (2014, TV Series) .... Colin Campbell
 Game of Thrones (2014–2019, TV Series, 13 episodes) .... Yohn Royce
 Chewing Gum (2015, TV Series) .... Big Boss
 Versailles (2015, TV Series, 2 episodes) .... Throckmorton
 Father Brown (2016, TV Series) .... Arthur Le Broc
 Casualty (2016-2021 TV Series) .... Peter Jennings/Kenneth Stair
 Plebs (2016, TV Series) .... Tarquin
 A United Kingdom (2016) .... Sir Ian Fraser
 Tutankhamun (2016, TV Mini-Series) .... Flinders Petrie
 King Charles III (2017, TV Movie) .... Sir Matthew
 The Children Act (2017) .... Sherwood Runcie
 Outlander (2017, TV Series) .... Lord William Dunsany
 Doc Martin (2017-2022, TV Series) .... Professor Langan
 Gentleman Jack (2019, TV Series, 3 episodes) .... Charles Lawton
 The Crown (2019, TV Series, 1 episode) .... Cecil Harmsworth King
 Spy City (2020, TV series) .... Ian Stuart-Hay
 Kleo (2022, TV Netflix series) .... Otto Straub English Voiceover 
 Andor (2022, TV series, 2 episodes) ....  Chief Hyne

Video games

References

External links

1958 births
English male stage actors
English male television actors
English people of Dutch descent
Living people
People from Cranleigh
Male actors from Surrey
20th-century English male actors
21st-century English male actors